Del-One Federal Credit Union (formerly Delaware Federal Credit Union) is a credit union headquartered in Dover, Delaware. Del-One Federal Credit Union was officially chartered in 1960. Del-One is the largest credit union in Delaware. As of March 2020, Del-One had over $520 million in assets, serving over 72,000 members, and 11 branches.

History
Del-One was founded in 1960 as the Delaware Highway Federal Credit Union to serve employees of the Delaware State Highway Department. Seven years later, the credit union changed its name to Delaware State Employees Federal Credit Union. Its name was changed to Delaware Federal Credit Union in 1995. Del-One was granted a community charter the following year to serve the communities of Wilmington and Georgetown. In 2006, the credit union changed its name again to Del-One Federal Credit Union.

Mergers 
In 1996, Del-One Federal Credit Union merged with American Mirrex Federal Credit Union.

In 1999, Del-One Federal Credit Union merged with Delaware Transit Employees Federal Credit Union.

In 2008, Del-One Federal Credit Union merged with Department of Labor Federal Credit Union.

In 2013, Del-One Federal Credit Union merged with Seaford Federal Credit Union.

In 2015, Del-One Federal Credit Union merged with U-DEL Federal Credit Union, and Newport Site Employees Federal Credit Union.

In 2017, Del-One Federal Credit Union merged with ICI America Federal Credit Union, established in 1973.

Awards
 Forbes – Awarded Best-in-State Credit Union from Forbes' annual list of America's best credit unions in each state 2020 (state of Delaware).
 Readers Choice – Delaware's Favorite Credit Union in the Wilmington News Journal Reader's Choice Awards for 2012, 2013, 2014, 2015, 2016, 2017, and 2018.
 Top Workplace – Awarded as a Top Workplace from the Wilmington News Journal in 2013, 2014, 2015, 2016, 2017, and 2018.

References

External links
 Official website

Credit unions based in Delaware
Banks established in 1960
Companies based in Kent County, Delaware
1960 establishments in Delaware